A Very Kacey Christmas is a third studio album and first Christmas album by American country music artist Kacey Musgraves, released on October 28, 2016, through Mercury Nashville. Overall, it is Musgraves' sixth album, her third studio album, and first Christmas album. Produced by Musgraves, Kyle Ryan and Misa Arriaga, it features eight traditional Christmas songs and four originals. Special guest artists include Willie Nelson, The Quebe Sisters and Leon Bridges.

Background and recording
Musgraves first announced she was working on a Christmas album on June 1, 2016, before a formal announcement came on September 7, 2016. In an interview with Rolling Stone published on September 8, 2016, Musgraves called working on the album "one of the most enriching musical experiences." On recording the album, she states, "I really wanted to create a whimsical throwback holiday record, one that evokes feelings of nostalgia and simpler times. I think that the fine musicians and brains that were a part of this project have helped me create a body of music that can be added to people's classic collections."

Musgraves describes the album as "part western swing sprinkled with bits of classic pop, hazy Hawaiian moments and child-like fun that all comes to a nostalgic, melancholy end and ultimately is very 'me,'" and adds, "There can be a touch of sad feelings and memories during the holiday season for a lot of people so I knew when I went in to write I wanted to include all the emotions this time of year can bring out."

Promotion
In support of the album, Musgraves embarked on the "A Very Kacey Christmas" tour. It began November 26, 2016, in Windsor, Ontario, and concluded on December 21, 2016, in Fort Worth, TX. The tour's production was bigger than a typical Musgraves tour. In addition to her band it featured a strings section, an accordion, bass, saxophone, clarinet and backup singers.

Promotional appearances in the media included a performance of "Mele Kalikimaka" and "Christmas Makes Me Cry" on CMA's Country Christmas 2016 TV special. Musgraves also performed live on Good Morning America on November 30, 2016, The Tonight Show Starring Jimmy Fallon on December 1, 2016, The Talk on December 5, 2016, and on Late Night with Seth Meyers on December 7, 2016.

Critical reception

A Very Kacey Christmas received universal acclaim from music critics. At Metacritic, which assigns a normalised rating out of 100 to reviews from mainstream critics, the album has an average score of 82 based on 4 reviews, indicating "universal acclaim". Stephen Thomas Erlewine of AllMusic rated the album four and a half out of five stars and calls it "a sharp, playful, and warm holiday record, the kind that evokes the past while feeling fresh and seeming destined for many years of annual spins." Writing for Pitchfork and rating the album 6.8 out of 10, Marc Hogan states the album "glides naturally from her established Western-swing throwback aesthetic to kitschy exotica and vintage pop, with an expertly curated song selection that leans on campy novelties, classy standards, and a stocking’s worth of originals."

Track listing
Source: AllMusic

Personnel
Credits adapted from AllMusic.

Musicians

 Misa Arriaga – bells, acoustic guitar, gut string guitar, background vocals
 Leon Bridges – vocals
 Cohen Dabbs – background vocals
 Veda Dabbs – background vocals
 Fred Eltringham – drums, percussion
 Larry Franklin – background vocals
 Paul Franklin – pedal steel guitar
 Josh Hedley – sleigh bells
 Rory Hoffman – accordion, clarinet, bass clarinet, guitar, upright piano, baritone saxophone, whistling
 Gena Johnson – background vocals
 Adam Keafer – bass guitar, upright bass
 Dallas McVey – background vocals
 Kacey Musgraves – vocals, whistling
 Willie Nelson – vocals, guitar
 The Quebe Sisters – fiddle, background vocals
 Jimmy Rowland – Hammond B3, Mellotron, piano, Wurlitzer
 Kyle Ryan – autoharp, electric guitar, percussion, piano, sleigh bells, ukulele, vibraphone, background vocals
 Chris Scruggs – lap steel guitar, requinto
 Kenny Sears – background vocals
 Nathaniel Smith – cello
 Joe Spivey – background vocals

Technical personnel

 Misa Arriaga – producer
 Steve Chadie – engineer
 Ryan Gore – engineer, mixing
 Gena Johnson – assistant engineer, engineer, production coordinator
 Andrew Mendelson – mastering
 Kacey Musgraves – art direction, producer
 Mark Petaccia – engineer
 Kyle Ryan – producer
 Chris Stapleton – assistant engineer
 Kelly Christine Sutton – art direction, design, photography
 James Taylor – assistant engineer

Charts
A Very Kacey Christmas debuted at No. 143 on the Billboard 200, selling 4,800 copies in its first week of release. The album reached a new peak position of 97 on the Billboard 200 chart dated December 17, 2016. It later re-entered the charts on December 14, 2019 alongside Musgraves new Christmas special The Kacey Musgraves Christmas Special, reaching a new peak of 21. As of January 2017 the album has sold 55,100 copies in the US.

Weekly charts

Year-end charts

Release history

References

2016 Christmas albums
Kacey Musgraves albums
Christmas albums by American artists
Country Christmas albums
Mercury Nashville albums